Amic Energy is an Austrian company that operates a network of 470 mobile and stationary filling stations and 20 charging stations for electric vehicles in Austria, Latvia, Lithuania, Poland, and Ukraine. The company is headquartered in Vienna. As of 2020, Amic Energy is the fifth largest network in Ukraine by sales volume and holds 6.7% of the Ukrainian retail fuel market.

History

Origins 

Amic Energy Management GmbH was founded in 2013. It started as an investment company looking for low-cost and problematic assets for further restructuring. One of the company's strategic goals was to invest in undervalued assets in Central and Eastern Europe, particularly in the energy infrastructure sector. Initially, the company considered investing in power plants in Romania and Bulgaria, as well as other projects in Poland. However, when Lukoil announced the sale of its assets in Eastern Europe in 2014, Amic Energy became interested in the possibility of acquiring a filling station network in Ukraine. When Lukoil's management commented on its plans to sell in July 2014, it said that it wanted to focus on Russian projects, as Western sanctions on Russia made it difficult for the company to access capital. Since 2014, Lukoil has sold assets in the Czech Republic, Ukraine, Estonia, Latvia, Slovakia, Lithuania, Poland, and Hungary. For example, Lukoil's assets in the Czech Republic were bought by the Hungarian MOL Group, in Hungary and Slovakia by the Hungarian company Norm Benzinkút Kft, in Estonia by the local network Olerex.

Acquisition of assets in Ukraine 

The main agreement between Amic Energy and Lukoil to purchase all the shares of Lukoil-Ukraine, which owned about 240 petrol stations and 6 oil depots in Ukraine, was announced in July 2014. At that time, Lukoil controlled 6% of the retail market in Ukraine, behind the petrol station networks of Privat group, WOG and OKKO companies. The total value of the deal was estimated at US$280 million. In April 2015, the Anti-Monopoly Committee of Ukraine approved the company Amic Energy Management GmbH (Vienna, Austria) to take control of Lukoil-Ukraine CFI (Kyiv). In May 2015, Lukoil-Ukraine CFI changed its name to Amic Ukraine CFI, and the company's petrol stations began to change their names.

Acquisition of assets in Latvia, Lithuania, and Poland 

Lukoil's management justified the company's plans to sell assets in Latvia and Lithuania with the anti-Russian sentiment in these countries. The completion of the acquisition was announced in April 2016. AS Viada Baltija and UAB Luktarna took over the retail networks in Latvia and Lithuania respectively as part of the deal. In 2018, Amic Polska began rebranding its petrol stations in Poland to the Amic Energy brand. The rebranding was completed in July 2019. In October 2019, Amic Energy acquired two petrol stations in Cieszyn from BP, bringing the company's total number of petrol stations in Poland to 116.

Russian invasion of Ukraine (2022) 

In the first days of the Russian invasion of Ukraine in February 2022, when Russian troops crossed the Antonivskyi Bridge in Kherson, two Amic Ukraine petrol stations located near the bridge were destroyed. In addition, as of February 6, 2023, 36 petrol stations of AMIC Ukraine were damaged, looted or destroyed by the aggressor and 19 others are still in temporarily occupied territories of Ukraine. The Russians also destroyed the company's oil depot near Borodianka (Kyiv region). The company estimates that in the first six months of the invasion, US$20 million worth of the company's assets (petrol stations, oil depot and fuel) were damaged by the hostilities. According to the company, during the first six months, Amic Ukraine supplied over 250,000 litres of fuel free of charge to units of the Armed Forces of Ukraine, the Security Service, the National Police, the State Border Guard Service, military administrations and territorial communities of various regions. The company also supplied aviation fuel for the Defence Forces of Ukraine.

Structure and owners 

Amic Energy Holding GmbH holds 100% of the shares in Amic Energy Management GmbH. As of 2015, Amic Energy Holding GmbH was owned by three Austrian citizens — lawyer Johannes Klezl-Norberg, investor Manfred Kunze, and banker Heinz Sernetz. As of April 2022, the owners of the company were Austrian citizens Günter Maier, Johannes Klezl-Norberg, Andreas Sernetz, and Irish citizen Gillen Philip Andrew.

The structure of Amic Energy Management GmbH includes:

Supply sources 

As of 2016, Amic Ukraine purchased fuel in Belarus, Latvia, Lithuania, Poland and Russia. According to the company, from 2017‒2018 Amic Ukraine was among the market leaders in diversification towards European sources of supply, also actively working with the Kremenchuk (Ukraine) and Mozyr (Belarus) oil refineries. According to the 2021 results, Amic Ukraine was among the top 5 suppliers of Lithuanian petroleum products to Ukraine (according to the A-95 consulting group). As of 2022, the company purchased about 30% of its fuel from the Mažeikiai refinery of the Polish group Orlen. Amic Polska sells only Orlen fuel.

Financial indicators 

According to the 2020 results, Amic Ukraine achieved a turnover of 7.37 billion hryvnias (US$258.5 million) with a loss of 1.7 billion hryvnias (US$59.6 million), ranking 80th among the largest private companies in Ukraine (according to Forbes.ua) and 130th among all top companies in Ukraine (according to Business.Censor.net). Amic Ukraine also ranked 5th among Ukrainian petrol station networks in terms of the amount of taxes paid and 3rd in terms of the calculation of taxes paid per litre of fuel sold (according to the project "Rating. Business in official figures"), and it was the only network in the top 10 with a single legal entity. In September 2022, the chairman of the Tax Committee of the Verkhovna Rada, Danylo Hetmantsev, highlighted Amic Ukraine among the companies that increased the tax burden during the war.

Controversies

Allegations of fictitious sale 

Following the announcement of the agreement to sell Lukoil-Ukraine CFI to Amic Energy in 2014, some commentators suggested that the real owner of the network in fact remained Lukoil, which was doing so to protect its Ukrainian assets from possible sanctions. The media also drew attention to the fact that the Amic Energy company was only registered in Austria in 2013 and that Amic Energy's authorised capital at the time of its foundation was only 35 thousand euros, which journalists believed could indicate that it was a shell company. In response to these allegations, Günter Maier, CEO of Amic Energy, stated at a press conference in Kyiv in September 2014 that the purchase was not fictitious and was not being carried out in the interests of Lukoil or Lukoil shareholders: "I can confirm that the assets are being acquired only in the interests of three Amic shareholders and at their own expense".

Similarly, following Amic Energy's 2016 acquisition of the Lukoil petrol station network in Latvia, Lithuania, and Poland, the Polish newspaper Puls Biznesu claimed that "the same Lukoil is hiding under the new brand, which thus wants to circumvent the boycott of European consumers who do not want to buy petrol from the Russians". In February 2022, Amic Polska declared that its "network of 116 Polish Amic Energy petrol stations is not linked by capital to the Lukoil company or other business organisations of the Russian Federation". In response to similar concerns in Lithuania, in March 2016 UAB Amic Lietuva submitted the conclusion by the Republic of Lithuania's Commission for assessment of conformity of potential participants to national security interests, which certified that the agreement between Amic Energy and Lukoil is in the interest of Lithuania's national security.

Accusations of ESBU 

In August 2022, the Economic Security Bureau of Ukraine (ESBU) announced the initiation of the seizure of 308 assets of the Amic Ukraine CFI network, totalling over 50 million hryvnias (US$1.3 million) in corporate rights. In particular, the ESBU accused the company of tax evasion and maintaining links with Russia. Amic Energy responded by calling both accusations "unfounded and baseless" and claimed that ESBU's actions were evidence of "deliberate illegal pressure on a foreign investor". Günter Maier, the ultimate beneficial owner and managing director of Amic Energy, denied all allegations against the company at a press conference in Kyiv in September 2022, and announced that Amic Ukraine had appealed to the Court of Appeal to overturn the decision on the seizure of assets in Ukraine, and would defend its rights at the national level and turn to international institutions if necessary. The Austrian Ambassador to Ukraine, Arad Benkö, called on the Ukrainian authorities to take proportionate measures that do not hinder business as long as no guilt is proven and stated that the Austrian embassy would closely follow the investigation.

References 

Privately held companies of Austria
Energy companies of Austria
Filling stations in Ukraine